Järva Parish is a municipality in Järva County, Estonia. It was created in 2017 as a merger of 6 municipalities: Albu Parish, Ambla Parish, Imavere Parish, Järva-Jaani Parish, Kareda Parish and Koigi Parish.

Religion

References 

 
Järva County